Laurie J. Scott  (born 1962) is a Canadian politician who served as Ontario Minister of Infrastructure from 2019 to 2021 and Minister of Labour from 2018 to 2019 in the Doug Ford cabinet. She is a Progressive Conservative member of the Legislative Assembly of Ontario representing the riding of Haliburton—Kawartha Lakes—Brock since 2018.

Background
Scott was born and raised in the village of Kinmount, Ontario, now part of the city of Kawartha Lakes. Her father, the late Bill Scott, was a federal Progressive Conservative MP from 1965 to 1993. She attended Loyalist College in Belleville where she obtained a degree in nursing. She worked as a Registered Nurse at the Ross Memorial Hospital and the Toronto General Hospital.

Politics
In the Canadian general election of 2000, she ran in Haliburton—Victoria—Brock for the federal Progressive Conservative party, but finished behind Liberal John O'Reilly and Canadian Alliance candidate Pat Dunn in a close, three-way race.  From 2000 to 2003, she worked as an assistant to Progressive Conservative Senator Consiglio Di Nino.

Scott was elected to the Ontario Legislature in the 2003 provincial election, defeating Liberal candidate Jason Ward in the riding of Haliburton—Kawartha Lakes—Brock by over 7,000 votes. Scott was appointed opposition critic for training, colleges and universities.

In the 2007 provincial election, Scott ran against Rick Johnson of the Ontario Liberal Party, and Joan Corrigan of the Ontario NDP. She defeated the Liberal candidate by almost 10,000 votes with 49.9% of the total vote. She then served as the official opposition critic for research and innovation and health promotion.

On January 8, 2009, it was announced that Scott would resign as MPP to allow PC leader John Tory to seek a seat in the legislature. However, Tory was defeated by Johnson in the by-election that followed. Scott subsequently served as chair of the Ontario PC party's election preparedness committee until the 2011 election.

In the 2011 election, in a rematch with Johnson, Scott regained her seat defeating Johnson by about 6,000 votes. She was re-elected in the 2014 election defeating Johnson again by about 3,000 votes. She then served as the Official Opposition Critic for Community Safety and Women's Issues until 2018.

In the 2018 Ontario provincial election, Laurie Scott was re-elected for a fifth-term as the MPP for Haliburton-Kawartha Lakes-Brock. She received 56.7% of the vote and won with a margin of victory of more than 17 000 votes over the second-place NDP candidate Zac Miller. When the PCs returned to government following the 2018 general election, Scott was appointed to cabinet as Minister of Labour by Premier Doug Ford. After a cabinet shuffle in 2020, she was demoted to Minister of Infrastructure, a portfolio she held until June 18, 2021. Since June 18, 2021, Scott holds no portfolio in the Ford cabinet and is currently a backbencher.

She is a passionate advocate for victims of human sex trafficking and was recognized with the BOOST Champion for Children Award in 2017 for her work.

Cabinet positions

References

External links
 

1962 births
Living people
Members of the Executive Council of Ontario
People from Kawartha Lakes
Progressive Conservative Party of Ontario MPPs
Women government ministers of Canada
Women MPPs in Ontario
21st-century Canadian politicians
21st-century Canadian women politicians